The following are the statistics of the Turkish First Football League in season 1993-1994.

Overview
Sixteen teams took part and Galatasaray S.K. won the championship. The teams Karabükspor, Karsiyaka and Sariyer got relegated.

League table

Results

Top scorers

References

Turkey - List of final tables (RSSSF)

Süper Lig seasons
1993–94 in Turkish football
Turkey